Rafik Ben Amor (born 18 November 1952) is a Tunisian volleyball player. He competed in the men's tournament at the 1972 Summer Olympics.

References

External links

1952 births
Living people
Tunisian men's volleyball players
Olympic volleyball players of Tunisia
Volleyball players at the 1972 Summer Olympics
Place of birth missing (living people)